Lalwani is a surname of Sindhis. Notable people with the surname include:

Bhupen Lalwani (born 1999), Indian cricketer
Jiten Lalwani, Indian film and television actor
Laksh Lalwani (born 1996), Indian model and actor
Menaka Lalwani, Indian actress
Natania Lalwani (born 1992), Indian singer-songwriter
Nikita Lalwani, Indian-born Welsh novelist
Sardarmal Lalwani (1910-2004), Indian politician
Shankar Lalwani (born 1961), Indian politician and Member of Parliament